Panggezhuang Town is a town in the western side of Daxing District, Beijing, China. It shares border with Beizangcun Town and Tiangongyuan Subdistrict to the north, Weishanzhuang Town to the east, Lixian and Yufa Towns to the south, Gongcun and Liulihe Towns to the west. In 2020, it had a population of 74,912.

This town's name Panggezhuang is referring to the early settlers of this region who were from the Pang family.

History

Administrative divisions 
So far in 2021, Panggezhuang Town was made up of 60 subdivisions, of those 6 were communities, 53 were villages, and 1 was a development area:

See also 

 List of township-level divisions of Beijing

References 

Towns in Beijing
Daxing District